Flight Lieutenant Julie Ann Gibson was the first full-time female pilot for the Royal Air Force when she graduated in 1991. Previously a ground-based officer, later selected for flying training. She was subsequently assigned to No. 32 Squadron RAF flying Hawker Siddeley Andovers, and following her promotion to Flight Lieutenant, Lockheed C-130 Hercules at RAF Lyneham.

Career
Julie Ann Gibson was born into a military family, her father was a Lieutenant commander in the Royal Navy. Because of his military career, Gibson travelled frequently during her childhood as he was posted in different ports around the world. She attended the City, University of London, where she graduated in 1983 with a Bachelor of Science degree in aeronautical engineering. While at University, she had learnt to fly and had joined the associated University Air Squadron.

Gibson joined the Royal Air Force College in 1984, and following her officer training, she was posted to RAF Honington in Suffolk. She was initially in charge of 75 engineers. In the following assignment, she commanded 160 men in the McDonnell Douglas F-4 Phantom II tactical weapons unit. Alongside fellow female pilot Sally Cox, Gibson took her first solo flights in 1990 at RAF Linton-on-Ouse. She successfully applied for pilot training, going on to train in the Advanced Flying Training Wing. She graduated as the first female pilot in the RAF on 14 June 1991 at No. 6 Flying Training School RAF, within RAF Finningley. She was assigned to No. 32 Squadron RAF, where she flew Hawker Siddeley Andovers out of RAF Northolt. She was subsequently promoted to Flight Lieutenant, and assigned to fly Lockheed C-130 Hercules at RAF Lyneham.

See also
Jo Salter - first female combat pilot for the RAF

References

Living people
Women's Royal Air Force officers
British women aviators
Royal Air Force officers
Aviation pioneers
English aviators
Alumni of the University of London
1956 births